Orient Queen may refer to:

 MV Orient Queen (so named 2006-2013), launched 1968 as MS Starward, renamed Aegean Queen, broken up in 2017
 Orient Queen (1989) (so named 2012-2020), launched 1989 as Vistamar, capsized 2020

Ship names